John Bacon  (24 November 1740 – 7 August  1799) was a British sculptor who worked in the late 18th century. Bacon has been reckoned the founder of the British School of sculpture. He won numerous awards, held the esteem of George III, and examples of his works adorn St Paul's Cathedral and Westminster Abbey in London, Christ Church, Oxford, Pembroke College, Oxford, Bath Abbey and Bristol Cathedral.

Biography
John Bacon was born in Southwark on 24 November 1740, the son of Thomas Bacon, a clothworker whose family had formerly held a considerable estate in Somersetshire. At the age of fourteen, John was apprenticed to Mr Crispe's porcelain manufactory at Lambeth, where he was at first employed in painting small ornamental pieces of china. He was swiftly promoted to modeller and used the additional income to support his parents, then in straitened circumstances. Observing the models sent by different eminent sculptors to be fired at the adjoining pottery kiln determined the direction of his genius: he began imitating them with such proficiency that a small figure of Peace sent by him to the Society for the Encouragement of the Arts won a prize. Subsequently, its highest awards were given to him nine times between 1763 and 1776. During his apprenticeship, he also improved the method of working statues in stoneware, an art which he afterwards carried to perfection.

Bacon first attempted working in marble around 1763, when he resided in George Yard on Oxford Road near Soho Square. He exhibited a medallion of George III and a group of Bacchanalians that year and a bas relief of the Good Samaritan the next. During this period, he was led to improve the method of transferring the form of the model to the marble ("getting out the points") by the invention of a more perfect instrument for the purpose. This instrument possessed many advantages: it was more exact, took a correct measurement in every direction, was contained in a small compass, and could be used on either the model or the marble.

By 1769, Bacon was working for Eleanor Coade's Artificial Stone Manufactory. The same year he was awarded the first gold medal for sculpture awarded by the Royal Academy for a bas-relief representing the escape of Aeneas and Anchises from Troy. In 1770, he exhibited a figure of Mars, redone in marble the next year for Charles Pelhalm, which gained him the gold medal from the Society of Arts and his election as an associate of the Royal Academy (ARA). In 1771, Eleanor Coade appointed him works supervisor at her manufactory: he directed both model-making and design there until his death. In 1774, he was gifted with a new establishment at 17 Newman St. by a Mr Johnson who was a great admirer of his work. He executed a bust of George III for Christ Church, Oxford, and retained that king's favour throughout his life. Jealous competitors criticised him for ignorance of classic Greek sculpture, a charge he refuted with a bust of Jupiter Tonans. In 1795, he completed a statue of John Howard for St Paul's Cathedral. That statue was the first to be erected on the floor of the cathedral, ending a century-long prohibition on monuments in the body of that church. Bacon was considered the most successful public sculptor in England at the time and the church authorities awarded him the commissions for the next two statues erected in the cathedral, that of Samuel Johnson in 1795 and of the judge Sir William Jones in 1799.

On 4 August 1799 Bacon suddenly developed an "inflammation" and died a little more than two days later on the 7th. He was buried in Whitefield's Tabernacle in London. His estate was valued at £60,000, which was divided equally among his children. His widow was his second wife; he left a family composed of six sons and three daughters. His sons Thomas Bacon and John Bacon Jr. continued his work, and one of his daughters married the artist Mr Thornton. His memoirs were edited by Rev. Cecil and published in 1801.

Legacy
Bacon has been reckoned the founder of the British School of sculpture, although he himself considered Roubiliac's statue of Eloquence for Waterloo Bridge to be such a fine piece of sculpture that he was sure he could never equal it. He won numerous awards, held the esteem of George III, and continued to be praised in the 19th and 20th centuries. His works adorn St Paul's Cathedral and Westminster Abbey in London, Christ Church, Oxford, Pembroke College, Oxford, Bath Abbey and Bristol Cathedral.

Selected public works

1770-1779

1780-1789

1790-1794

1795-1799

Other works
Bust of Samuel Johnson, Pembroke College, Oxford
Bust of George III in Christ Church, Oxford (1770)
Bust of John Guise in Christ Church, Oxford (1770)
Seated statue of William Blackstone, the Codrington Library, All Souls, Oxford (1784)
Pediment, Guy's Hospital, London (c. 1774) 
Chimneypiece for the Duke of Richmond at Goodwood House (1777)
Bust of Samuel Foote exhibited at Royal Academy (1778)
Monument to Mrs Draper, Bristol Cathedral (1780)
Bust of Sir Francis Dashwood for his mausoleum at West Wycombe, Buckinghamshire (1780)
Bust of Inigo Jones for the Carpenters Hall, London (1780) 
Monument to James Harris in Salisbury Cathedral (1780)
Monument to John Bentley Ashley and his wife, Church of St Leogidanius, Ashby St Ledgers, Northamptionshire (1784)
Statue of Henry VI for Eton College sited in the Upper Chapel (1786)
Memorial to Admiral Samuel Graves in Dunkeswell, Devon (1787)
Monument to Sir Walden Hanmer, 1st Baronet, at Simpson, Buckinghamshire (1789)
Monument to James Dennis, 1st Baron Tracton in Cork, Ireland (1781)
Ornate chimney-piece at Fonthill Abbey (1790)
Ornate chimney-piece for Warren Hastings at Daylesford House (1793)
Monument to John Milton in St Giles Cripplegate, London (1793)
Bust of the 3rd Duke of Portland for the Rockingham Mausoleum at Wentworth Woodhouse (1793)
Bust of John Howard for Shrewsbury Prison (1793)
Pediment for the offices of the East India Company (1797–99)
Monument to Samuel Whitbread at Cardington, Bedfordshire (1799)

References

 

Attribution:

External links 

 
 Profile on Royal Academy of Arts Collections

1740 births
1799 deaths
18th-century Methodists
18th-century English sculptors
18th-century English male artists
English male sculptors
English Methodists
People from Southwark
Royal Academicians
Sculptors from London